The third season of the Fairy Tail anime series was directed by Shinji Ishihira and produced by A-1 Pictures and Satelight. Like the rest of the series, it follows the adventures of Natsu Dragneel and Lucy Heartfilia of the fictional guild Fairy Tail. The season contains two story arcs. The first 24 episodes adapt the rest of the manga's 20th volume through the beginning of the 24th volume to form the  arc, wherein the guild becomes trapped in the parallel universe Edolas to be used by the world's ruler Faust to restore magic to his kingdom, and set out to return to their world with the aid of Faust's son Mystogan and Happy's race of winged cats called the Exceed. The remaining 4 episodes adapt the rest of the 24th volume through the beginning of the 25th volume as part of the  arc, which focuses on Natsu and the guild's other strongest members as they take their S-Class examination on Sirius Island.

The season initially ran in 2011 from April 4 to October 8 on TV Tokyo in Japan. Seven DVD compilations were released, each containing four episodes, by Pony Canyon between August 3, 2011, and February 1, 2012.  The season was licensed for a dubbed broadcast in English by Animax Asia, which released it as part of "Season 2". Funimation Entertainment released the episodes with their own English-dubbed version across three Blu-ray/DVD box sets, released on December 10, 2013, and February 4 and March 25 in 2014 along with the first four episodes of season 4. The first two sets were released as together as "Collection 4" on June 2, 2015.

The season makes use of 6 pieces of theme music: three opening themes and three ending themes. "Evidence" performed by Daisy x Daisy is used until episode 84, "The Rock City Boy" performed by Jamil until 98, and  performed by Daisy x Daisy for the rest of the season. Feel!!!" performed by Idoling!!!, and  performed by Hi-Fi Camp.


Episode list

Notes

References

General

Specific

3
2011 Japanese television seasons